Hartmut Thieme (born 20 November 1947 in Oberhausen) is a German prehistoric archaeologist at the Institut für Denkmalpflege in Hannover. He known for leading the team that discovered Europe's oldest known spears in a coal mine in Schöningen, Germany.

References

Further reading
: Hartmut Thieme - ein Berufsleben für die Altsteinzeitforschung in: , 1/2013, S. 37-39

1947 births
Living people
Archaeologists from North Rhine-Westphalia